Walter L. Pratt (1868 – April 3, 1934) was an American businessman and politician from New York.

Life
He was born in 1868 in Lowell, Middlesex County, Massachusetts. He attended Phillips Academy. In 1889, he went to Adams, Jefferson County, New York, and engaged in the lumber business there. In 1904, he moved to Massena, St. Lawrence County.

Pratt entered politics as a Republican, and was President of the Village of Massena from 1920 to 1922. He was a member of the New York State Assembly (St. Lawrence Co., 2nd D.) in 1923, 1924, 1925, 1926, 1927, 1928, 1929, 1930, 1931, 1932, 1933 and 1934. He was Chairman of the Committee on Taxation and Retrenchment from 1927 to 1934.

He died on April 3, 1934, of heart disease; and was buried at the Ogdensburgh Cemetery.

Sources

1868 births
1934 deaths
People from Massena, New York
Republican Party members of the New York State Assembly
Phillips Academy alumni
People from Lowell, Massachusetts
People from Adams, New York